Hypophloeda is a genus of fungi within the Melanconidaceae family. This is a monotypic genus, containing the single species Hypophloeda rhizospora.

References

External links
Hypophloeda at Index Fungorum

Melanconidaceae
Monotypic Sordariomycetes genera